Augusto Martín Batalla Vargas (born 30 April 1996) is an Argentine professional footballer who plays as a goalkeeper for San Lorenzo, on loan from River Plate. He is a former Argentina U20's international.

Club career
Batalla is product of the River Plate academy, which he joined as a five-year old. In 2015, River Plate accepted a loan offer from La Liga side Real Madrid for Batalla with the option of a permanent move. However, Batalla turned down the move to Real Madrid for personal reasons.

He made his first-team debut in 2016 and was promoted by Manager Marcelo Gallardo as first-choice goalkeeper after Marcelo Barovero left the club. Batalla remained as the club's first choice goalkeeper, initially impressing, winning the 2015–16 Copa Argentina and the 2016 Recopa Sudamericana titles, before losing his place after errors and the signing of German Lux in June 2017.

After falling further down the pecking order after the signing of Argentina goalkeeper Franco Armani in January 2018. On 5 January 2018, Batalla signed a one-year loan deal with fellow Argentine Primera División side Atlético Tucumán. After impressing and helping the club progress in the Copa Libertadores, On 25 June, Batalla announced on his social media he would be leaving Atlético Tucumán from his loan spell early.

International career
He has represented Argentina at various youth levels, including winning South American Under-17 Football Championship in 2013 for the Argentina U17 's where he won the Best goalkeeper of the South American Under-17 Football Championship's and he also won the South American Youth Football Championship for the Argentina U20 in 2015.

Honours
Club
River Plate
Recopa Sudamericana: 2016
Copa Argentina: 2015–16

Argentina U17
South American Under-17 Football Championship: 2013
Argentina U20
South American Youth Football Championship: 2015

Individual
Best goalkeeper of the South American Under-17 Football Championship.

References

External links

1996 births
Living people
Argentine footballers
Argentine expatriate footballers
Argentina youth international footballers
Argentina under-20 international footballers
Association football goalkeepers
Club Atlético River Plate footballers
Atlético Tucumán footballers
Club Atlético Tigre footballers
Unión La Calera footballers
O'Higgins F.C. footballers
San Lorenzo de Almagro footballers
Argentine Primera División players
Chilean Primera División players
Argentine expatriate sportspeople in Chile
Expatriate footballers in Chile
Sportspeople from Buenos Aires Province